Ali Khalifa Rahuma  (born May 16, 1982) is a Libyan football midfielder, also a Libyan national. He currently plays for Al-Ittihad, and is a member of the Libya national football team.

External links

SoccerPunter. “Ali Khalifa Rahuma Profile and Statistics.” SoccerPunter. SoccerPunter, n.d. Web. 6 Sept. 2016

1982 births
Living people
Libyan footballers
Libya international footballers
Association football midfielders
Al-Ittihad Club (Tripoli) players
Al-Ahli SC (Tripoli) players
Libyan Premier League players